Phaseolus maculatus (Metcalfe bean, prairie bean, spotted bean) is a plant native to Mexico and the southwestern United States from Arizona, New Mexico, and Texas. It is found on dry, rocky hillsides in meadows and in wooded areas from 1500 to 2400 m (5000–8000 ft) in elevation.

P. maculatus is a trailing perennial herb with a large, woody taproot. Leaves are trifoliate, oval, up to 8 cm (3.2 in) long, with small uncinate (hooked) hairs. Leaf blades tend to be oriented vertically so they do are not pressed against the ground. Flowers are purple. Seeds are mottled black and brown.

Uses
This bean is often used as livestock forage, and it is cited as a gene source for disease resistance in the lima bean (P. lunatus) by Germplasm Resources Information Network. The Tarahumara peoples of the Sierra Madre Occidental in Chihuahua use the roots medicinally and also make glue from the shoots. The species is also occasionally grown as an ornamental.

References

External links

USDA Plans Profile: Phaseolus maculatus

maculatus
Flora of Chihuahua (state)
Flora of Sonora
Flora of Sinaloa
Flora of Arizona
Flora of New Mexico
Flora of Texas
Flora of North America